Dirk Dresselhaus (born 28 August 1970), better known by his stage name Schneider TM, is a German musician from Bielefeld.

Discography

References

External links 

 Official website for Schneider TM
 MirrorWorldMusic 
 [ Allmusic entry on Schneider TM]
 Synconation Interviews Schneider TM

German electronic musicians
1970 births
Living people
City Slang artists